Sven Pieters (born 5 June 1976) is a former sprint hurdler from Belgium.

Biography
He finished fourth in the 110m Hurdles at the 1994 World Junior Championships, then a year later won the silver medal at the European Junior Championships.  He participated in the 1996 Olympic Games and the 1997 World Championships

Achievements

References

1976 births
Belgian male hurdlers
Olympic athletes of Belgium
Athletes (track and field) at the 1996 Summer Olympics
Living people